Herbaspirillum rhizosphaerae is a Gram-negative bacterium of the genus Herbaspirillum isolated from rhizosphere soil of Allium victorialis var. platyphyllum on Ulleung Island in Korea.

References

External links
Type strain of Herbaspirillum rhizosphaerae at BacDive -  the Bacterial Diversity Metadatabase

Burkholderiales
Bacteria described in 2007